Burning Fortune is the second studio album by the Canadian heavy metal band Cauldron. Recording started in August 2010 in Rogue Studios. The only single from the album is "All or Nothing", with a music video released on 19 March 2011.

Track listing

Personnel
Jason Decay - vocals, bass guitar
Ian Chains - guitar
Chris Steve - drums

2011 albums
Cauldron (band) albums
Earache Records albums